Lukáš Bodeček (born 25 April 1988) is a retired Czech footballer. Besides the Czech Republic, he has also played in Slovakia.

Career

Later career
In the summer 2017, Bodeček moved to TJ Sokol Čížová. He then moved to FK Kosoř. 

In addition, Bodeček also worked as a fitness coach for various of the youth teams at SK Slavia Prague since the summer 2017. As of 2020, he was still in this position at Slavia.

References

External links
 
 
 Lukáš Bodeček at Roteiro
 Profile at Vysočina Jihlava website

1988 births
Living people
Czech footballers
Association football defenders
Czech First League players
Slovak Super Liga players
Czech expatriate footballers
Czech expatriate sportspeople in Slovakia
Expatriate footballers in Slovakia
SK Sigma Olomouc players
FC Vysočina Jihlava players
FC DAC 1904 Dunajská Streda players
FK Baník Most players
FK Viktoria Žižkov players